Avraham or Abraham Stern may refer to:

 Avraham Stern (1907–1942), Irgun leader and founder of the "Stern Gang" breakaway group
 Avraham Stern (politician) (1935–1997), Israeli politician
 Abe Stern (1888–1951), American film producer, co-founder of Universal Studios
 Abraham Stern (inventor) (c. 1760s–1842), Polish Jewish inventor